Bishop Jebalamai Susaimanickam was a bishop of the Roman Catholic Diocese of Sivagangai, India from year 2005 to 2020. He resigned from his services on reaching the episcopal retirement age on 1 September 2020.

Early life 
Susaimanickam was born in Maruthakanmoi, Tamil Nadu, India, on 25 September 1945.

Priesthood 
On 27 January 1971, Susaimanickam was ordained a priest for the Roman Catholic Archdiocese of Madurai.

Episcopate 
19 March 2005 Pope John Paul II announced, Susaimanickam to be appointed as Coadjutor Bishop of the Roman Catholic Diocese of Sivagangai, India and on  1 April 2005, he was appointed and consecrated as a bishop on 15 May 2005 by Peter Fernando.

On 1 September 2005, Susaimanickam  succeeded as the bishop of the Roman Catholic Diocese of Sivagangai.

Susaimanickam resigned from his services as the bishop of the Roman Catholic diocese of Sivagangai on 1 September 2020 after reaching the retirement age.

See also 
 List of Catholic bishops of India

References 

1945 births
Living people
21st-century Roman Catholic bishops in India